The 2005 McDonald's All-American Girls Game was an All-star basketball game played on Wednesday, March 30, 2005 at the Joyce Center in South Bend, Indiana, home of the Fighting Irish of Notre Dame. The game's rosters featured the best and most highly recruited high school girls graduating in 2005.  The game was the 4th annual version of the McDonald's All-American Game first played in 2002.

The 48 players were selected from 2,500 nominees by a committee of basketball experts. They were chosen not only for their on-court skills, but for their performances off the court as well. Coach Morgan Wootten, who had more than 1,200 wins as head basketball coach at DeMatha High School, was chairman of the selection committee. Legendary UCLA coach John Wooden, who has been involved in the McDonald's All American Games since its inception, served as chairman of the Games and as an advisor to the selection committee.

Proceeds from the 2005 McDonald's All American High School Basketball Games went to Ronald McDonald House Charities (RMHC) of South Bend and Fort Wayne, Indiana and their Ronald McDonald House programs.

2005 Game
The fourth annual McDonald’s All American Girls game showcased one of the best displays of teamwork over the past four years.

The West was led by stellar play from game MVP Courtney Paris (Chicago Sky) who contributed 16 points, 12 rebounds and four blocks.  She helped set the pace when the West went on a 20-5 run to break the game open.  The West shot a solid 56% from the floor in the second half and 50% from beyond the arc. Paris’ brilliant play was matched by teammate Alexis Gray-Lawson (California) who poured in 12 points and dished out three assists and three steals. The Morgan Wootten National Player of the Year Abby Waner (Duke) added nine points, four rebounds and three assists for the West.

Other key contributors for the West were Lindsay Schrader (Notre Dame) and Ashley Paris (Los Angeles Sparks) who dropped in nine and eight points respectively.

The East received a game-high 19 points from Marissa Coleman (Washington Mystics) and 12 points from Carrem Gay (Connecticut Sun). Kia Vaughn (New York Liberty) ripped down seven boards to go along with her four points.

West Roster

East Roster

Coaches
The West team was coached by:
 Head coach Kelly Flynn of South Sioux City High School (South Sioux City, Nebraska)
 Asst Coach Russ Fuchser of South Sioux City High School (South Sioux City, Nebraska)

The East team was coached by:
 Head coach Anna Jackson of Murrah High School (Jackson, Mississippi)
 Asst Coach Arthur Brown of Murrah High School (Jackson, Mississippi)

Boxscore

Visitors: West

Home: East 

(* = Starting Line-up)

All-American Week

Schedule 

 Tuesday, March 29: Powerade Jamfest
 Three-Point Shoot-out
 Timed Basketball Skills Competition
 Wednesday, March 30: 4th Annual Girls All-American Game

The Powerade JamFest is a skills-competition evening featuring basketball players who demonstrate their skills in two crowd-entertaining ways.  Since the first All-American game in 2002, players have competed in a 3-point shooting challenge and a timed basketball skills competition.

Contest Winners 
 Erika Arriaran was winner of the 2005 3-point shoot-out.
 The skills competition was won by Christina Wirth

See also
2005 McDonald's All-American Boys Game

References

External links
 McDonald's All-American on the web

2005 in American women's basketball
2005